was a village located in Shioya District, Tochigi Prefecture, Japan.

As of 2003, the village had an estimated population of 2,068 and a density of 4.84 persons per km². The total area was 427.37 km².

On March 20, 2006, Kuriyama, along with the city of Imaichi, the town of Ashio (from Kamitsuga District), and the town of Fujihara (also from Shioya District), was merged into the expanded city of Nikkō. As a result of the merger, no villages remain in Tochigi Prefecture.

External links
 Nikkō official website 
  

Dissolved municipalities of Tochigi Prefecture
Nikkō, Tochigi